Suha Katalena  is a village in Croatia in the Đurđevac municipality. 

Populated places in Koprivnica-Križevci County
Đurđevac